Liberty Historic District or Liberty Downtown Historic District may refer to:

 Liberty Downtown Historic District (Liberty, Kentucky)
New Liberty Historic District, New Liberty, Kentucky
 Liberty Downtown Historic District (Liberty, New York), NRHP-listed
 Liberty Historic District (Liberty, North Carolina)
 Liberty Historic District (Liberty, Tennessee), NRHP-listed
 Liberty Historic District (Liberty, Washington), listed on the NRHP in Kittitas County, Washington

See also
Liberty Street Historic District (disambiguation)
Penn-Liberty Historic District, Pittsburgh, Pennsylvania
West Liberty Commercial Historic District, West Liberty, Iowa
West Liberty Courthouse Square Historic District, Liberty, Missouri